TP-13 is an anxiolytic drug with a novel chemical structure, which is used in scientific research. It has similar effects to benzodiazepine drugs, but is structurally distinct and so is classed as a nonbenzodiazepine anxiolytic. It is a subtype-selective partial agonist at GABAA receptors, binding selectively to GABAA receptor complexes bearing α2 and α3 subunits. It has modest anticonvulsant activity although less than that of diazepam, and its main effect is likely to be selective anxiolytic action, as seen with other related α2/3-preferring agonists such as L-838,417.

References 

Anxiolytics
Ethers
Triazoles
Triazolopyridazines
GABAA receptor positive allosteric modulators
Cyclobutyl compounds